Cormocephalus brachyceras is an Australian species of centipede. It is commonly found around south-east Queensland and north-east New South Wales, under logs and rocks in a variety of habitats.

References

brachyceras
Centipedes of Australia
Animals described in 1983